The 1922–23 Kansas Jayhawks men's basketball team represented the University of Kansas during the 1922–23 NCAA men's basketball season in the United States. The head coach was Phog Allen, coaching in his sixth overall season with the Jayhawks. The team finished the season with a 17–1 record and were named national champions by the Helms Athletic Foundation for the second consecutive season.

The team was led by senior guard Paul Endacott, junior guard Charlie Black, and sophomore forward/center Tus Ackerman.  Endacott and Black were both retroactively named 1923 NCAA Men's Basketball All-Americans, and Endacott was also named the national player of the year. The team also included reserve senior Adolph Rupp, who went on to have a Hall of Fame coaching career at Kentucky.  The Jayhawks were later named National Champions by the Helms Athletic Foundation, which Kansas claims alongside their NCAA Tournament Championships as national titles they have won.

Roster
Tusten Ackerman
Waldo Bowman
Paul Endacott
Byron Frederick
Andrew McDonald
James Mosby
Adolph Rupp
Charlie T. Black
William Wilkin

Schedule and results

|-
!colspan=9 style="background:#00009C; color:red;"| Regular season

Source

References

Kansas Jayhawks men's basketball seasons
NCAA Division I men's basketball tournament championship seasons
Kansas
Kansas Jayhawks Men's Basketball Team
Kansas Jayhawks Men's Basketball Team